is a former Japanese football player.

Playing career
Okuhara was born in Inagi on July 31, 1972. After graduating from Chuo University, he joined Japan Football League club Tokyo Gas (later FC Tokyo) in 1995. He played many matches as offensive midfielder from 1996. The club results rose year by year and won the champions in 1998. The club was promoted to new league J2 League from 1999. However he could not play many matches for injury and left the club end of 1999 season.

Club statistics

References

External links

1972 births
Living people
Horikoshi High School alumni
People from Inagi, Tokyo
Chuo University alumni
Association football people from Tokyo Metropolis
Japanese footballers
J2 League players
Japan Football League (1992–1998) players
FC Tokyo players
Association football midfielders